The South Africa national netball team, nicknamed the SPAR Proteas, represents South Africa in women's international netball. The Proteas are currently coached by Australian coach Norma Plummer who returned to the role for a second time in November 2022, and are captained by Bongiwe Msomi. The team are governed by Netball South Africa and sponsored by SPAR. South Africa are currently fifth in the INF World Rankings.

History
South Africa have long been among the top five ranked nations in netball, having twice won medals at the World Cup, once with a third-place finish in 1967 and later securing runner-up status to Australia in 1995. The national team was barred from participating in international test matches in 1969 because of the country's apartheid policies and were not readmitted until 1995. Their surprise appearance in 1995 World Cup Final came off the back of an historic victory over New Zealand earlier in the tournament and saw the team receive a medal from President Nelson Mandela personally.  The SPAR Proteas have never claimed a medal at the Commonwealth Games.

As well as competing in World Cups and at the Commonwealth Games, the Proteas also regularly participate in the Quad Series annually against Australia, New Zealand and England, though the team has never finished above fourth place in the tournament. The Proteas also feature in the all-African Diamond Challenge tournament most years, which they have won on each occasion thus far.

In June 2022 just a month before the Commonwealth Games, Netball South Africa announced its first ever group of contracted players.

Competitive record

Players

Current team 
The current squad was selected for the 2023 Quad Series

Sponsorship
SPAR
Telkom
Hollywoodbets 
Puma

See also
Netball in South Africa
Sport in South Africa
Netball in Africa
Diamond Challenge
Confederation of African Netball Associations (CANA)

References

External links
 Netball South Africa

National netball teams of Africa
   
Netball